Wales and the Barbarians have played each other four times at test level; Wales have won on two occasions. In non-test meetings between the two teams, the Barbarians have been the most successful, winning four of the six encounters. Most of the matches have been played at the home of Welsh rugby in the city of Cardiff; at Cardiff Arms Park prior to the opening of the Millennium Stadium in 1999. Only one match has been played away from the Millennium Stadium since then, at Ashton Gate Stadium in Bristol in 2004.

Summary of matches and results

References

Barbarian F.C. matches
Wales national rugby union team matches